Lisówek may refer to:

Lisówek, Grodzisk Mazowiecki County, Poland
Lisówek, Grójec County, Poland